Liz Miller is an installation artist from Minnesota. She creates abstract installations in art galleries from paper, plastic, cloth and other materials. Many of her installations have been large enough for patrons to walk into or through them. Miller teaches realistic style art classes which include art theory and acrylic painting techniques plus watercolors and mixed media.  She creates her art with mostly DecoArt products and paint.

Background
Liz Miller lives in Good Thunder, Minnesota. She has a Bachelor of Fine Arts degree from the Rhode Island School of Design and a Master of Fine Arts from the University of Minnesota. she is Professor of Installation and Drawing at Minnesota State University, Mankato. Miller also has a Bachelors of Nursing degree from North Carolina in Chapel Hill. Miller's installations and works on paper have been featured in solo and group exhibitions regionally, nationally and internationally. Awards Miller received include a 2013 McKnight professional development grant from Forecast Public Art.

Exhibitions
 Painters & Sculptors Program (2011) Liz Miller
 Artist in Residence (2016) Liz Miller
 Liz Miller "Proliferative Calamity"
 Liz Miller "Recalcitrant Mimesis"

References

Sources
 Minnesota original: Liz Miller PBS series
 Local Artist Interviews: Liz Miller Installation
 ARTmn: Liz Miller
 The Line: Artist Liz Miller's installations explore the beauty in devastation
 Wonderland: Liz Miller's Eye-Popping Installation at Space Gallery
 The University of Iowa Grant Wood Art Colony: Colony welcomes Liz Miller, sculptor
 Gustavus Adolphus College: Closing Reception for Artist Liz Miller
 HuffPost: Liz Miller expands on Still's vocabulary
 Dailyserving: Co-opting Form: An interview with Liz Miller
 Liz Miller exhibit traces topography an artist's mind

Year of birth missing (living people)
Living people
21st-century American women artists
American art educators
American women installation artists
American installation artists
Artists from Minnesota
Rhode Island School of Design alumni 
University of Minnesota alumni